Sand Hills State Park is located north of the city of Hutchinson in Reno County, Kansas, United States.

History
In 1974, the Kansas Park and Resources Authority acquired  from the Kansas State Industrial Reformatory.  This section of land became the 22nd state park in Kansas by a House Bill signed by Governor Robert Docking. Shortly after this transfer, the Dillon Family of Hutchinson donated an adjacent . With the donation, the Kansas Park and Resources Authority was able to acquire another adjacent  with Federal Land and Water Funds, thus establishing the present  Sand Hills State Park.

Geography
The dunes were formed by windblown deposits of sand transported from the Arkansas River at the end of the last glacial period.

See also
Nebraska Sandhills
Monahans Sandhills State Park
Blowout (geology)
Sand dune ecology
Big Basin Prairie Preserve

References

External links
Sand Hills State Park

Protected areas of Reno County, Kansas
State parks of Kansas
Protected areas established in 1974
1974 establishments in Kansas